William Joseph Ging (November 7, 1872 – September 14, 1950) was a pitcher in Major League Baseball.

Ging was born in Elmira, New York. He started his professional baseball career in 1898. In 1899, he had a win-loss record of 16-17 for the Connecticut League's New London Whalers. He appeared in his only major league game on September 25, when he started and completed the Boston Beaneaters' final game of the season, a 2-1 win over the New York Giants.

Ging then played in the minor leagues from 1900 to 1904. He died in his hometown of Elmira in 1950.

References

External links

1872 births
1950 deaths
19th-century baseball players
Major League Baseball pitchers
Boston Beaneaters players
New London Whalers players
Syracuse Stars (minor league baseball) players
Oswego Pioneers players
Cortland Wagonmakers players
Amsterdam-Gloversville-Johnstown Jags players
Amsterdam-Gloversville-Johnstown Hyphens players
Baseball players from New York (state)
Sportspeople from Elmira, New York